The Haverford College Arboretum is an arboretum comprising the entire campus of Haverford College, in Haverford, Pennsylvania. It is open daily, dawn to dusk, without charge.

As of 2006, the arboretum contains mature oaks and maples, specimen trees, flowering trees, and natural woodland areas. Over 1,500 trees are labeled with their scientific name, common name and nativity. Specific points of interest include:

Ryan Pinetum - Over 300 mature conifers, labeled and arranged by family groupings.
State champion trees - Loblolly Pine, Pinus taeda; and Hinoki False Cypress, Chamaecyparis obtusa. 
Penn Treaty Elm - a descendant of the American Elm under which William Penn signed his treaty with Native Americans; planted 1915. In 2010, a descendant of Haverford's Elm was planted in Penn Treaty Park, the site of the 1683 treaty. 
Asian gardens - the Denis Asian Garden and Teaf Memorial Zen-style Garden.
2.2-mile Nature Trail - A public, wooded recreation trail following the perimeter of campus, popular with runners and dog walkers

History 

The arboretum's origins stretch back to 1831, when the campus property was purchased by a group of Welsh Quakers. The College itself was founded two years later. 

In 1834, English gardener William Carvill laid out the campus in the English landscape tradition championed by noted landscape architect Sir Humphry Repton. 

In 1901, shortly after the discovery of Carvill's original landscape drawings, students and alumni seeking to preserve Haverford's natural beauty formed the Campus Club.

In 1928 the College minutes record that "a comprehensive planting of trees" was discussed, and in response the Superintendent of Grounds began a scientific collection of trees arranged in generic and family groupings. 

The Haverford College Arboretum Association was founded in 1974 and continues to oversee the preservation of historic landscapes and trees; the implementation of sustainable plantings and practices; and the development of educational community programming.

See also
List of botanical gardens in the United States
ArbNet

Further reading

External links
Haverford College Arboretum
Facebook
Instagram
Philadelphia - America's Garden Capital
Tree Campus USA

Arboreta in Pennsylvania
Botanical gardens in Pennsylvania
Haverford Township, Pennsylvania
Parks in Delaware County, Pennsylvania